The 2012 Northeast Conference men's basketball tournament was held between March 1 and 7. All games were held on the campus sites of the higher seed. LIU Brooklyn won the championship, its fourth, and received the conferences automatic bid  to the 2012 NCAA tournament. This is LIU's second NEC Tournament Championship in a row, having won it last year.

Format
The top 8 teams in the standings will qualify for the tournament.  
The field will be re-seeded after the Quarterfinals so that the #1 seed will host the highest remaining seed, and #2 will host the lowest remaining seed. Bryant is in its final transition year and remains ineligible to participate in any post-season tournaments.

Bracket
All games will be played at the venue of the higher seed.

All-tournament team
Tournament MVP in bold.

References

Northeast Conference men's basketball tournament
Tournament
Northeast Conference men's basketball tournament
Northeast Conference men's basketball tournament